Hamid Darwich Mido (born 3 June 1993 in Syria) is a Syrian footballer. His older brother is Mohamad Mido
Hamid is the first Syrian to win AFC Cup for clubs 2 times with 2 different teams, Al ittihad of Aleppo and Aire Force Iraqi club.

Honours

Club 
Al-Quwa Al-Jawiya
 AFC Cup: 2016
 Iraq FA Cup: 2015–16

References

External links
 

1993 births
Living people
Syrian footballers
Syria international footballers
Syrian expatriate footballers
Expatriate footballers in Iraq
Expatriate footballers in Kuwait
Expatriate footballers in Qatar
Syrian expatriate sportspeople in Iraq
Syrian expatriate sportspeople in Kuwait
Syrian expatriate sportspeople in Qatar
Al-Ittihad Aleppo players
Al-Mina'a SC players
Al-Quwa Al-Jawiya players
Al Tadhamon SC players
Al Salmiya SC players
Kuwait SC players
Al-Shamal SC players
Kuwait Premier League players
Qatari Second Division players
Association football midfielders
Sportspeople from Aleppo
Syrian Premier League players